Nebria ferganensis is a species of ground beetle in the Nebriinae subfamily that is endemic to Kyrgyzstan.

Subspecies
The species bears 2 subspecies all of whom are endemic to Kyrgyzstan: 
Nebria ferganensis ferganensis Shilenkov, 1982
Nebria ferganensis urumbashi Kabak & Putchkov, 1996

References

ferganensis
Beetles described in 1982
Beetles of Asia
Endemic fauna of Kyrgyzstan
Insects of Central Asia